The 1927–28 Swiss International Ice Hockey Championship was the 13th edition of the international ice hockey championship in Switzerland. HC Rosey Gstaad won the championship by defeating HC Davos in the final.

First round

Eastern Series 
 HC St. Moritz - HC Davos 1:3

HC Davos qualified for the final.

Western Series

Semifinals 
 HC Rosey Gstaad - Star Lausanne 14:1
 HC Château-d'Oex - HC La Chaux-de-Fonds 6:2

Final 
HC Château-d'Oex - HC Rosey Gstaad 1:13

HC Rosey Gstaad qualified for the final.

Final 
 HC Rosey Gstaad - HC Davos 4:3

External links 
Swiss Ice Hockey Federation – All-time results

Inter
Swiss International Ice Hockey Championship seasons